Barbara Dawson (born 26  April 1957) is an Irish author, editor, art historian, gallery director, and curator. She is curator of several art exhibitions including the works of notable artists such as Francis Bacon (2009). 

Dawson is the first female director of the Hugh Lane Gallery, a municipal art gallery and "the first known public gallery of modern art in the world" in Dublin. She has been the gallery's director since 1991. She authored several books including Hugh Lane Gallery: Director's Choice. 

She is the recipient of the 2019 University College of Dublin Alumni Award, in part for being "one of the most significant figures in the Irish art world in recent decades".

Education

Dawson graduated from University College Dublin in 1979 with a bachelor's degree in history. 

In recognition of her 2010 contributions to the fine arts, she received an honorary Doctor of Fine Arts degree from the National College of Art & Design (NCAD), and is an adjunct professor at the School of Art History and Cultural Policy, University College Dublin. In 2019, she was awarded the UCD Alumni Award in Arts & Humanities.

She serves as a member of the Dublin City Council's Public Art Advisory Committee, and has been a mentor to women at other Irish museums.

Art gallery career
Dawson's early gallery experiences began with the National Gallery of Ireland. In 1991, at the age of 34, she became the Director of the Hugh Lane Gallery, located in Parnell Square in Dublin. The gallery is owned by the municipality of Dublin and overseen by Dublin's city manager, to whom Dawson, as gallery director, reports via the City and County Librarian.
 
Frieze Masters wrote of Dawson's accomplishments at the Hugh Lane Gallery that "Dawson's capable negotiations are among her numerous successes during her tenure as director. Here, she has built upon the existing collections and innovated new collection strands, developed conservation infrastructures, advanced and digitized the archive, adapted display architectures (including a bespoke space for the historic stained-glass collection), introduced a strong publishing strand, enhanced the education and public programs, installed a cafe and a bookshop, and continuously energized both the temporary and contemporary exhibition programmes".

Dawson has curated notable exhibitions for Hugh Lane Gallery, such as:
Francis Bacon – A Terrible Beauty (with Martin Harrison; 2009)
Barry Flanagan on O'Connell Street (2007) 
Hugh Lane – 100 Years (2008)
Richard Tuttle – Triumphs (with Michael Dempsey; 2010)

Dawson acquired Francis Bacon's London studio for the museum in 1998. The 6 meter by 4 meter studio was reconstructed inside the Hugh Lane Gallery to the smallest details, including ceiling, flooring, and dirt.

According to The Phoenix, in 2017, Dawson launched a five-year strategy for "doubling visitor numbers, significantly upping funding, undertaking a near €4m refurbishment programme and purchasing major artworks" from 2018 to 2023.

Theft of In The Omnibus
In June 1992, the year after Dawson became Director of the Hugh Lane Gallery, the painting In The Omnibus by French artist Honore Daumier was stolen. The theft took place in the afternoon during the hours when the gallery was open to the public. The Criminal Assets Bureau (CAB) recovered the painting during an investigation in 2013, more than 20 years later. Dawson expressed her delight that the painting had been found. She said "It was such a shock when it was stolen and we had messages of sympathy from galleries and museums in Ireland and around the world."

Author and editor
Dawson has authored and edited multiple books and texts on contemporary and modern art such as:
Turner in the National Gallery of Ireland, Dublin (1988); 
Images and Insights: Catalogue of an Exhibition of Works from the Permanent Collection at the Hugh Lane Municipal Gallery of Modern Art, Dublin, 1993 - with Sean O'Reilly, Christina Kennedy, Crista Maria Lerm, Catherine Marshall, Daire O'Connell, and Wanda Ryan Smolin, 
Impressionism in Britain and Ireland - with Kenneth McConkey (June 1995); 
 Francis Bacon: Francis Bacon's Studio - with Margarita Cappock (July 2001); 
Hugh Lane: Founder of a Gallery of Modern Art for Ireland, Scala (2008) 
 Francis Bacon: A Terrible Beauty Steidl (28 February 2010);  
 Barry Flanagan: The Spade and The Soufflé (Richard Tuttle)

Reception
Rosemarie Mulcahy review of Municipal Gallery of Modern Art, Dublin, 1993, published in the Irish Arts Review Yearbook (1995): Mulcahy describes Barbara Dawson's essay Hugh Lane and the Origins of the Collection as a "well documented introductory" and that it "outlines the persistent efforts of Hugh Lane to establish a Gallery of Modern Art for Dublin."
Julian Campbell, artist and art historian, reviewed Impressionism in Britain and Ireland by Kenneth McConkey, Barbara Dawson, published in Irish Arts Review Yearbook (1997): "However, in its condensed Dublin showing, the exhibition looked superb in the Hugh Lane Gallery – Irish paintings such as Osborne's Tea in the Garden and Lavery's re-discovered early Bridge at Grez (1883) held their own in the company of Monet and Sargent; Stanhope Forbes's Fish Sale on a Cornish Beach was a remarkable piece of naturalism, as fresh as if it had been painted yesterday."

See also 

 Women in the art history field

References

1957 births
Living people
Place of birth missing (living people)
Irish art historians
Alumni of University College Dublin
Irish women curators
Women art historians
21st-century Irish women
20th-century Irish women
Irish women academics
Irish women non-fiction writers